General elections were held in Siam on 15 November 1933 to elect 78 of the 156 members of the House of Representatives, with the other 78 appointed by the King. The elections were held on an indirect basis, with voters electing sub-district representatives between 10 October and 15 November, and the representatives then electing members of parliament on 16 November.

At the time there were no political parties, so all candidates ran as independents. Voter turnout was 41.5%. This was the first parliamentary election in Siamese history.

Results

References

Siam
General
Elections in Thailand
Election and referendum articles with incomplete results
Non-partisan elections